Robert Boochever (October 2, 1917 – October 9, 2011) was a United States circuit judge of the United States Court of Appeals for the Ninth Circuit and a justice of the Alaska Supreme Court.

Education and career 

Born in New York City, Boochever received a Bachelor of Arts degree from Cornell University in 1939 where he was a member of the Quill and Dagger society, and a Bachelor of Laws from Cornell Law School in 1941. He was a captain in the United States Army Infantry during World War II, from 1941 to 1945. He was an assistant United States attorney in Juneau, Alaska from 1946 to 1947 and then worked in private practice in Juneau until 1972. He was a justice of the Alaska Supreme Court from 1972 to 1980, serving as chief justice from 1975 to 1978.

Federal judicial service 

On May 22, 1980, Boochever was nominated by President Jimmy Carter to a seat on the United States Court of Appeals for the Ninth Circuit vacated by Judge Shirley Hufstedler. He was confirmed by the United States Senate on June 18, 1980, and received his commission the same day. He assumed senior status on June 10, 1986, due to a certified disability. He served in that capacity until his death, though he did not hear any new cases in the last few years of his life.

Personal life and death 
Boochever met chief surgery nurse Connie Boochever while working on a base. They were married on April 22, 1943. Skier Hilary Lindh is one of their grandchildren.

Boochever died of natural causes on October 9, 2011, at the age of 94 at his home in Pasadena, California.

References

External links 
 

1917 births
2011 deaths
Justices of the Alaska Supreme Court
United States Army personnel of World War II
Assistant United States Attorneys
Cornell Law School alumni
Judges of the United States Court of Appeals for the Ninth Circuit
Politicians from Ithaca, New York
People from Juneau, Alaska
Lawyers from New York City
Military personnel from New York City
People from Pasadena, California
United States Army officers
United States court of appeals judges appointed by Jimmy Carter
20th-century American judges
Chief Justices of the Alaska Supreme Court